Gianfranco Roberto Espinoza Andrade (born 28 August 1986 in Lima) is a Peruvian international footballer who most recently played for Sport Boys as a defender.

Club career
Espinoza has played for Coronel Bolognesi, Sport Boys, Alianza Atlético and León de Huánuco.

International career
He made his international debut for Peru in 2011.

References

External links

1986 births
Living people
Footballers from Lima
Association football central defenders
Peruvian footballers
Peru international footballers
Peruvian Primera División players
Coronel Bolognesi footballers
Sport Boys footballers
Alianza Atlético footballers
León de Huánuco footballers
Club Deportivo Universidad de San Martín de Porres players
Unión Comercio footballers